Kelly Stables is an American actress who has appeared on stage, as well as in film and television. She is known for her television roles, such as Melissa on Two and a Half Men, Eden Konkler on The Exes, and Kelly on Superstore.

Personal life
Stables graduated from the University of Missouri in Columbia, earning a bachelor's degree in Communication with an emphasis in Television and Theatre Performance minor. While at the University of Missouri she was a member of Delta Gamma.

By March 2005, corresponding with the release of The Ring Two in theaters, she married Kurt Patino. They have two sons together, born in 2012 and 2015. Her first pregnancy was written into the second season of her TV show, The Exes.

Career
Stables has acted in a number of plays. Her two largest theatrical roles were in the Thousand Oaks Civic Light Opera's production of Peter Pan as Wendy, and in Sleeping Beauty as the title character. She has also played several other stage roles, most notably that of Marion Davies in W.R. and the Daisy.

Stables is best known in the world of film for the stunt work she did for The Ring (2002), and for taking over for Daveigh Chase in portraying the (off-tape) evil Samara Morgan for The Ring Two. She was also in the short film Rings (2005). Her roles in the Bring it On and Ring franchises would boost her popularity to the point of gaining mention in Rolling Stone, Star and Us Weekly. From 2004 to 2006, she voiced Will Vandom on W.I.T.C.H., and had roles on General Hospital and St. Bartes-Aspen. She also briefly appeared in the unaired pilot for The Grubbs in 2002, and had a role in an episode of Cavemen in November 2007, playing a 12-year-old cavekid boy.

Stables had a recurring role as Melissa, Alan Harper's receptionist (and recurring/former girlfriend) in Seasons 6–8 of Two and a Half Men. She also worked on a film called My Life Untitled, guest-starred on 'Til Death as a travel agent, and appeared in a Burger King commercial as a woman who is selling things on infomercials.

In 2010, she co-starred on the ABC show Romantically Challenged playing Lisa Thomas, Alyssa Milano's character's sister. She is the "Sexpert" of the group offering often unwanted advice. The show was canceled after airing only 4 episodes. In 2011, she played a character named Claire on an episode of the CBS sitcom Mad Love, and landed a regular role as Eden on the TV Land sitcom The Exes until the series ended in 2015. In 2016, Stables joined the cast of The CW's No Tomorrow, playing Mary Anne, the sister of the main character, Evie. Stables then landed a recurring role on the third season of the NBC show Superstore in 2017, as Kelly, a quirky new hire who eventually becomes the love interest of Jonah Simms.

Most recently, Stables voiced the role of a mouse in the 2020 film Dolittle.

Filmography

Film

Television

Video games

Radio
 Adventures in Odyssey

Stage
 Peter Pan
 Sleeping Beauty

References

External links

American film actresses
American musical theatre actresses
American stunt performers
American television actresses
American video game actresses
American voice actresses
University of Missouri alumni
Living people
21st-century American actresses
Year of birth missing (living people)